Waputik Peak was named by George Mercer Dawson in 1884. It is located in the Waputik Range in Alberta.

"Waputik" means "white goat" in the Stoney language.

Geology

Like other mountains in Banff Park, Waputik Peak is composed of sedimentary rock laid down during the Precambrian to Jurassic periods. Formed in shallow seas, this sedimentary rock was pushed east and over the top of younger rock during the Laramide orogeny.

Climate

Based on the Köppen climate classification, Waputik Peak is located in a subarctic climate zone with cold, snowy winters, and mild summers.

See also

Geology of Alberta
Geography of Alberta
Mountains of Alberta

References

Two-thousanders of Alberta
Alberta's Rockies